In Vergil's Aeneid, Erulus is a king of Praeneste. At birth, he was given three souls (animae) by his mother, the goddess Feronia, who also tripled his ability to defend himself by giving him three sets of arms.

Vergil tells his story through the Arcadian king Evander, founder of Pallantium, who allies with the Trojan immigrants led by Aeneas. Evander regrets that the frailty of old age keeps him from fighting at Aeneas's side, and reminisces about the warrior deeds of his youth:

No other literary source mentions Erulus; he may be Vergil's pure invention, based on the mythological figure Geryon, or given that his mother's cult is represented only sparsely in literary sources, he may belong to an archaic tradition to which no other reference survives. Some scholars have seen Erulus as an influence on Spenser's conception of Triamond's three-fold life in The Faerie Queene.

References

Kings in Roman mythology
Characters in the Aeneid